Denny Clanton (born April 4, 1982, in Hammond, Indiana) is an American soccer player who last played defense for the Chicago Fire of Major League Soccer.

Clanton was drafted 38th overall by the Fire in the 2004 MLS Superdraft out of University of Dayton, succeeding in making the team's developmental roster. While at Dayton, Clanton was named All-Atlantic 10 first team as well as All-Ohio Player of the Year in his senior 2004 season. He played a year in MLS, appearing in ten games. After being dropped by Chicago, Clanton signed with MISL's Chicago Storm.

References

1982 births
Living people
American soccer players
Chicago Fire U-23 players
Chicago Fire FC players
Chicago Storm (MISL) players
Sportspeople from Dayton, Ohio
Dayton Flyers men's soccer players
USL League Two players
Major League Soccer players
Chicago Fire FC draft picks
Soccer players from Indiana
Sportspeople from the Chicago metropolitan area
Sportspeople from Hammond, Indiana
Association football defenders